Simmondsin is a component of jojoba seeds (pronounced "ho-HO-bah") (Simmondsia chinensis). While it had been considered toxic due to jojoba seed meal causing weight loss in animals, in recent years its appetite suppressant effect has also been researched as a potential treatment for obesity. It is thought to reduce appetite by increasing levels of cholecystokinin.

References 

Anorectics
Cyanogenic glycosides
Plant toxins